Docking protein 4 is a protein that in humans is encoded by the DOK4 gene.

References

Further reading